Tamara Rubí Barrón García (born March 30, 1989), known under the ring name La Magnífica (Spanish for "The Magnificent"), is a Mexican luchadora enmascarada, or masked female professional wrestler currently working for the Mexican professional wrestling promotion Consejo Mundial de Lucha Libre (CMLL). La Magnifica is a second-generation wrestler, the daughter of Gran Cochisse.

Personal life
La Magnífica is the daughter of professional wrestler Gran Cochisse and the original La Magnífica as well as the sister of Super Estrella and Saturno who also works for CMLL. She is also the sister-in-law of wrestler El Sagrado who is married to one of La Magnífica's sisters that is not involved in professional wrestling.

La Magnífica was married to Rey Celestial until he was killed in a hit and run incident while out walking in his hometown of Puebla on September 17, 2017. She has a son from this marriage.

Championships and accomplishments
Arena Azteca Budokan
AAB International Women's Championship (1 time)
Lucha Libre AAA Worldwide
AAA Quien Pinta Para La Corona (2011)
New Wrestling Generation
NWG Divas Championship (1 time)

Luchas de Apuestas record

Footnotes

References

External links 
 

1989 births
Living people
Mexican female professional wrestlers
Professional wrestlers from Jalisco
Masked wrestlers